"When We Dance" is a song by English musician Sting. It was released as a single on 17 October 1994 and is one of two new tracks included on his first greatest hits album Fields of Gold: The Best of Sting 1984–1994, alongside "This Cowboy Song". The song became Sting's only solo top 10 hit in his native UK and reached the top 40 in five other countries.

Background

Described by Sting as a "generic ballad", "When We Dance" was written specifically to be included as a new track for the Fields of Gold compilation. The song reportedly took a year to write: "I had the melody around for a whole year before I thought of what to do with it... Then it just fell in place. It wasn't one of those songs written in five minutes."

Upon its release, "When We Dance" peaked at number 9 in the UK, becoming Sting's only top ten solo single in his home country. It also reached the top ten in Canada (number 10) and Ireland (number 9). The song was less successful in the US, only appearing on the chart for one week, peaking at number 38.

The song was promoted with a music video directed by Howard Greenhalgh.

Track listing

All tracks written by Sting.

CD1

 "When We Dance" (Edit) – 4:55
 "Fortress Around Your Heart" (Hugh Padgham Remix) – 4:10
 "When We Dance" (Album Version) – 5:59
 "If You Love Somebody Set Them Free" (Soulpower Mix) – 7:00

CD2

 "When We Dance" (Edit) – 4:55
 "If You Love Somebody Set Them Free" (Soulpower Radio Mix) – 4:34
 "If You Love Somebody Set Them Free" (Soulpower Deep Dub) – 8:19
 "If You Love Somebody Set Them Free" (Soulpower Hip Hop Mix) – 5:37

Maxi–single (Europe)

 "When We Dance" (Edit) – 4:55
 "Fortress Around Your Heart" (Hugh Padgham Remix) – 4:10
 "If You Love Somebody Set Them Free" (Soulpower Mix) – 7:00
 "If You Love Somebody Set Them Free" (Soulpower Deep Dub) – 8:19

Charts

References

1994 singles
1994 songs
A&M Records singles
Songs written by Sting (musician)
Sting (musician) songs